Strübing is a surname. Notable persons with that surname include:

Christine Strübing (born 1952), German Olympic swimmer
Volker Strübing (born 1971), German book author and songwriter